Nigam is a subcaste of  Chitraguptavanshi Kayastha.

Notable people

 Sonu Nigam (Singer)
 Teesha Nigam (Singer)
 Shraddha Nigam (Actor)
 Satish Nigam (Politician)
 Siddharth Nigam  (Actor)
 Chamunda Nigam (Alchemist)

References

[ Chamunda Nigam, Page 40, Studies in Indian Literary History volume 1
by P. K. Gode 
https://archive.org/details/StudiesInIndianLiteraryHistoryVolume1/page/n517/mode/2up ]

Indian surnames
Kayastha